Merrem may refer to:
 Meropenem, an antibiotic initially marketed under the trade name Merrem
 Blasius Merrem (1761–1824), German naturalist, zoologist, ornithologist, mathematician, and herpetologist